Amílcar Augusto Queirós de Sousa (1876–1940) was a Portuguese medical doctor, and author of many health books, being the most famous O Naturismo (Naturism), published in 1912.

Biography

A pioneer of vegetarianism in Portugal, he was the president of the first Portuguese vegetarian society, the Sociedade Vegetariana de Portugal, founded in the city of Porto, 1911, and the director of O Vegetariano (The Vegetarian), a monthly magazine on vegetarianism.

A native of Alijó, Sousa corresponded with many well-known personalities from medicine and science, such as the German naturalist Ernst Haeckel, the American medical doctor John Harvey Kellogg, and the French physician Paul Carton.

He advocated a raw vegetarian diet. He was also against eggs, milk, tobacco and alcohol. He said that eating an egg was the same as ”eating a chicken embryo” and that milk was “not the food of man.”
 
D. M. Richardson wrote in the magazine The Healthy Life (July, 1912):

He was also a pacifist and frequently criticized war in his articles.

He considered Pythagoras to be the most notable philosopher of all time and wrote that Jean-Jacques Rousseau was the best educator, as in Émile, or On Education, he valued  education in contact with nature.

Sousa died in Porto in 1940.

Books in Spanish
Most of his books have been translated to Spanish. Some of them are:
 El naturismo La Gutenberg. 1913. Valencia.
 La salud por el naturismo La Gutenberg. 1918. Valencia
 Tesis médica naturista
 La curación del estreñimiento
 Catecismo naturista
 El naturismo en veinte lecciones
 Cómo detendremos la muerte? (with Capo, N.)
 Tesis Medica Naturista. Sauch. 1976. Barcelona

See also
Fruitarianism
Veganism
Raw foodism

References
 O Vegetariano: Mensário Naturista Ilustrado, Porto.
 Grande enciclopédia portuguesa e brasileira, Edição de Editorial Enciclopédia, limitada, 1936, volume 29, p. 761.
 Grande enciclopédia portuguesa e brasileira, Edição de Editorial Enciclopédia, limitada, 1936, volume 34, p. 416.
 Delmar Domingos de Carvalho, Vegetarianismo, a solução para uma vida e um mundo melhor, Editorial Minerva, Lisboa, 2009
 A fotografia como prova documental da robustez dos vegetaristas, vegetarianos e frugívoros

1876 births
1940 deaths
Portuguese nutritionists
Portuguese male writers
Portuguese translators
Portuguese non-fiction writers
Raw foodists
European pacifists
20th-century Portuguese physicians
19th-century Portuguese physicians
19th-century male writers
19th-century translators
Vegetarianism activists
Male non-fiction writers